De Beer's Pass is located in the KwaZulu-Natal province of South Africa.  It is situated on an unmarked road between Ladysmith and Harrismith (labelled as S61 on Google Maps) in the neighbouring Free State province.

This pass should not be confused with another pass of the same name located in South Africa's Eastern Cape province.

N3 realignment

A proposal has been made to reroute the nearby N3 national road over De Beer's Pass.

In March 2017, it was decided by SANRAL that the construction of the De Beer's Pass Route for the N3 will not continue, as it would have disturbed the economies of Harrismith and Van Reenen and possibly would have made them ghost towns.

References

Mountain passes of KwaZulu-Natal